The men's 10 metre air rifle event at the 2016 Olympic Games took place on 8 August 2016.

The event consisted of two rounds: a qualifier and a final. In the qualifier, each shooter fired 60 shots with an air rifle at 10 metres' distance from the standing position. Scores for each shot were in increments of 0.1, with a maximum score of 10.9.

The top 8 shooters in the qualifying round moved on to the final round. There, they fired an additional 20 shots. These shots scored in increments of one point, with an additional point in the center ring that is scored in increments of 0.1. Therefore, the maximum score is 10.9 per shot. The maximum score that can be achieved during qualification is 654.0.

Niccolò Campriani of Italy won the gold medal, Ukraine's Serhiy Kulish won the silver medal while Russia's Vladimir Maslennikov won the bronze medal.

Records
Prior to this competition, the existing world and Olympic records were as follows.

Qualification round

Final
The final was shot according to the ISSF regulations. The athletes shot 6 shots in 2×3 series before the lowest-ranked was eliminated every other shot.

References

Shooting at the 2016 Summer Olympics
Men's events at the 2016 Summer Olympics